Neeraj Patil (Kannada: ಡಾ. ನೀರಜ್ ಪಾಟೀಲ್) is a British politician from The Labour Party. A doctor of Indian origin who has served as A&E Consultant in the National Health Service for 15 years, he served as the Mayor of the London Borough of Lambeth from 2010 to 2011. A member of the Labour Party, he was the borough's first mayor of Asian origin. He is a member of FIRD Forum for International Relations Development and is engaged in promoting community cohesion between Indian and Pakistani communities in UK.

He is a consultant in Accident and Emergency Medicine who completed his fellowship at the Royal College of Surgeons of Edinburgh. He served as a Consultant in Emergency Medicine at Worthing Hospital and was a member of KWASH campaign to save the Emergency services at Worthing General Hospital. He was first elected as a Councillor for the Larkhall ward in 2006 and reelected in 2010. He was elected to serve as Mayor of Lambeth from 2010-2011.

He received Pope Benedict XVI during his official visit to London on 18 September 2010.

Career
Patil is from the Indian state of Karnataka. In 2008 he was awarded the "Rajyotsava Award" by the Government of Karnataka for promoting Accountable Democracy in India. Patil took the initiative to erect the statue of the 12th century philosopher and founder of Indian Democracy, Lord Basavanna installed at the Albert Embankment Gardens in the London Borough of Lambeth with the support of the London-based Pakistani-Muslim community and British Indian community of South London.

In 2017 Neeraj Patil was the first Kannadiga to run for the British House of Commons. He fought in Putney and lost to Education Secretary Justine Greening by 1,554 votes. Patil achieved a swing of 10.2% in favour of the Labour Party.

In 2018 Patil complained to the House of Commons authorities about improper use of parliamentary facilities by Labour MP Virendra Sharma.  His complaint was upheld although the House authorities did not consider it necessary to impose any penalty on Sharma. 

In August 2022, he unsuccessfully applied to contest Bassetlaw in Nottinghamshire as the Labour Party candidate at the next United Kingdom general election.

In October 2022 he was placed on the long list for consideration as the Labour candidate for  Camberwell and Peckham.

Political functions 
Patil has held the following political offices since he started a career in politics:
 Mayor of the London Borough of Lambeth (2010–2011);
 Lambeth Councillor, elected in 2006 and 2010
 Governor of Kings College Hospital (2006–2007);
 Governor of St Thomas Hospital (2008–2010);
 Member of the National Policy Forum, Labour Party (2013–2015);
 Member of National Executive BAME Labour (2009–2013);
 Member of NRI Forum Karnataka (2007–2010).

References

External links 
 
CV of Cllr Dr Neeraj Patil

Mayors of places in Greater London
Indian emigrants to England
British politicians of Indian descent
Labour Party (UK) councillors
Councillors in the London Borough of Lambeth
People from Kalaburagi
Living people
1968 births
Recipients of the Rajyotsava Award 2008
Labour Party (UK) parliamentary candidates
21st-century British politicians
21st-century Indian politicians